Ellinge is a village in central Denmark, located in Nyborg Municipality on the island of Funen. Elline is located three kilometers east of Ferritslev, 12 kilometers west of Nyborg and 19 kilometers southeast of Odense. The village is located in Nyborg Municipality and the Region of Southern Denmark.

History
Ellinge Church was built around year 1150-1200.

References

Cities and towns in the Region of Southern Denmark
Populated places in Funen
Nyborg Municipality
Villages in Denmark